Steve Kunzweiler is the current Tulsa County District Attorney. He has worked on shows for the Forensic Files, See No Evil and 60 Minutes.

Career 
Steve Kunzweiler was first elected in November 2014. In 2014,  Kunzweiler  challenged his opponent Fred Jordan's candidacy "in the Aug. 26 Republican primary runoff." Kunzweiler was "chief of the Tulsa County district attorney's criminal division. Kunzweiler argued Jordan isn't eligible to serve as DA because of a pay increase that was approved by the Legislature earlier this year." In 2018, Kunzweiler ran against Jenny Proehl-Day, who was running on a social justice platform and claimed Kunzweiler "denies that there’s any racial bias in the system." Kunnzweiler was elected for his second term. He worked under the former DA, Tim Harris, the longest serving DA in Tulsa History. Harris did not seek reelection and announced his run in 2017 for U.S. Congress District 1. In 2018, Kunzweiler was the prosecutor during the Bever family murders trial. In 2016, "he filed felony first degree manslaughter charges against" Betty Shelby. By 2018, he had "charged three police officers with shootings — Tulsa County Sheriff’s Office reserve deputy Robert Bates, Shelby and Shannon Kepler (an off-duty officer who shot and killed an unarmed black teen in 2015) — earning convictions on both Bates and Kepler."

In 2020, Kunzweiler declined charges toward Black Lives Matter protestors in Tulsa who painted the street with the words "Black Lives Matter, "referring the case back to the Tulsa city attorney’s office." In 2021, Kunzweiler refused to charge the man who drove into BLM protestors, paralyzing a man, Ryan Knight, who "fell from an interstate overpass as the truck pulling a horse trailer drove through the group of protesters on Interstate 244. The 32-year-old was paralyzed from the waist down." He "stopped short of endorsing proposals for harsher penalties for protestors or blanket immunity for drivers." Also in 2020, Kunzweiler defended Harris's work when Harris was accused in the 2020 NBC Dateline investigative episode of allegedly coercing one of two formerly convicted Black Tulsa brothers into confessions. Atchison's lawyer Joseph Norwood, pointed out that "If Harris and Kunzweiler questioned the credibility of the lone witness against Atchison, the case should have been dismissed."

In 2021, Kunzweiler said that the ruling on McGirt "isn't just a criminal matter but can also affect businesses."  Kunzweiler and First Assistant District Attorney Erik Grayless were to blame for "a public censure from the Oklahoma Bar Association after admitting during a professional tribunal last year that interns she supervised represented the agency in numerous criminal cases without being properly licensed" that happened in 2021.

In 2019, Kunzweiler organized a DA breakfast "where they could all come together for the first time ever" to later "feel comfortable to pick up the phone and call one of the district attorneys if they have a question about proposed legislation" that would affect their work. District Attorneys including Steve Kunzweiler have criticized the Oklahoma Pardon and Parole Board, who want the board to be more conservative in their considerations for parole and commutation, despite the Republican Governor Kevin Stitt having expressed full confidence. In the Tulsa World, the DAs were are said to be taking an increasingly more political role that has "to some degree weakened" the board's influence. Dark money conservative attack ads targeting Stitt as not tough enough on crime started airing in 2021.  The state of Oklahoma has the third highest incarceration rate in 2021 and its 2018 numbers show it incarcerates the most women per capita.

In 2022, Kunzweiler's office wrote a protest letter against April Wilkens's application for parole. It is speculated that the board did not grant her a hearing this period at least in part due to the protest letter. Hers was one of the first cases Tim Harris prosecuted as DA, and Harris later accepted campaign contributions after the trail from Terry Carlton's father, Don Carlton, as well as from Kunzweiler's wife. The same month as Wilkens was being denied parole by the (at the time) all-male board, they unanimously recommended the Crossbow Killer, Jimmie Stohler, be granted parole in the same meeting. Any DA protest for Stohler's release would have come from Kunzweiler's office. Governor Kevin Stitt approved the board's recommendation for Stohler's parole but reversed his decision, citing new, but undisclosed, "information" in what the Tulsa County DA's office had sent him. Stitt reversed his decision after accusations of racism for not also releasing Julius Jones.

In June 2022, after the fall of Roe, a representative of No Forced Birth OK have called Kunzweiler "no friend to the Black community, the Indigenous community, to the gay community, to any community except white straight men." On failure to protect laws, Kunzweiler said he viewed himself as a father punishing his daughters and that '"prosecutor’s job was to 'teach people the morals they either never learned or they somehow forgot.'" He has explained female incarceration "using a metaphor about spanking."

Personal life
Kunzweiler and his wife, Dr. Christine Kunzweiler, have three daughters. In September 2022, a daughter with mental illness stabbed Kunzweiler multiple times but he managed to survive. He is mentioned in the podcast Panic Button: The April Wilkens Case as having confronted a Tulsa social worker about how domestic violence advocates need to get survivors to testify, otherwise they are not really being abused.

See also
 Tim Harris 
 List of district attorneys by county
 Oklahoma Pardon and Parole Board
 United States Incarceration

References 

Living people
21st-century American lawyers
Year of birth missing (living people)
District attorneys in Oklahoma